The threadtail conger (Uroconger syringinus, also known as the slender-tail conger) is an eel in the family Congridae (conger/garden eels). It was described by Isaac Ginsburg in 1954. It is a marine, subtropical eel which is known from the eastern and western Atlantic Ocean, including the Gulf of Guinea, the Gulf of Mexico and Suriname.

References

Congridae
Fish described in 1954